CBC News is a division of the Canadian Broadcasting Corporation responsible for the news gathering and production of news programs on the corporation's English-language operations, namely CBC Television, CBC Radio, CBC News Network, and CBC.ca. Founded in 1941, CBC News is the largest news broadcaster in Canada and has local, regional, and national broadcasts and stations. It frequently collaborates with its organizationally separate French-language counterpart, Radio-Canada Info.

History
The first CBC newscast was a bilingual radio report on November 2, 1936. The CBC News Service was inaugurated during World War II on January 1, 1941, when Dan McArthur, chief news editor, had Wells Ritchie prepare for the announcer Charles Jennings a national report at 8:00 pm. Readers who followed Jennings were Lorne Greene, Frank Herbert and Earl Cameron. CBC News Roundup (French counterpart: La revue de l'actualité) started on August 16, 1943, at 7:45 pm, being replaced by The World at Six on October 31, 1966.

On English-language television the first newscast, part of CBC Newsmagazine, was given on September 8, 1952, on CBLT (Toronto), the only English station then telecasting. Later that year CBC National News was introduced (anchors: Larry Henderson, Earl Cameron, Stanley Burke), then changing its name to The National in 1970.

CBC began delivering news online in 1996 via the Newsworld Online website. The CBC News Online site launched in 1998.  In 2016, the site was renamed CBC Indigenous. In 2017, CBC News relaunched its flagship newscast, The National, with four co-anchors based in Toronto, Ottawa and Vancouver and later two anchors Monday through Thursday and a single anchor on Friday and Sunday.

News output

Television

The Television News section of CBC News is responsible for the news programs on CBC Television and CBC News Network, including national news programs like The National, Marketplace, The Fifth Estate, and The Investigators with Diana Swain. It is also responsible for The Weekly with Wendy Mesley until its cancellation in September 2020.

They are also responsible for news, business, weather and sports information for Air Canada's inflight entertainment.

Local

Most local newscasts on CBC Television are branded as CBC News: [city/province name], such as CBC News: Toronto at Six. Local radio newscasts are heard on the half-hour during morning and afternoon drive shows and on the hour at other times during the day.

Radio

The Radio News section of CBC News produces on-the-hour updates for the CBC's national radio newscasts and provides content for regional updates. Major radio programs include World Report, The World at Six, The World This Hour and The World this Weekend. The majority of news and information is aired on CBC Radio One. All newscasts are available on demand online, via apps or via voice-activated virtual assistants.

Online
CBC News Online is the CBC's CBC.ca news website. Launched in 1996, it was named one of the most popular news websites in Canada in 2012. The website provides regional, national, and international news coverage, and investigative, politics, business, arts and entertainment, investigative, politics, business, entertainment, Indigenous, health, science and tech news. An Opinion section was reintroduced in November 2016. Many reports are accompanied by podcasting, audio and video from the CBC's television and radio news services. CBC News content is available on multiple platforms including Facebook, Twitter and Instagram.

In November 2022, the CBC launched CBC News Explore, a free ad-supported streaming television service. In addition to existing CBC news and information programming, new original programming on the service includes About That, a daily news and interview show hosted by Andrew Chang; Planet Wonder, an environmental news series hosted by Johanna Wagstaffe; Big, a documentary series about industry; and This Week in Canada, which highlights local news stories from the CBC's local news bureaux in various cities.

Network 

CBC News Network (formerly CBC Newsworld) is an English-language news channel owned and operated by the CBC. It began broadcasting on July 31, 1989, from several regional studios in Halifax, Toronto, Winnipeg and Calgary. It was revamped and relaunched as the CBC News Network in 2009 as part of a larger renewal  of the CBC News division. Current programs include CBC News Now (based in Toronto with Heather Hiscox, Suhana Meharchand, Carole MacNeil, John Northcott, Andrew Nichols (weekdays) and Aarti Pole and Michael Serapio (weekends), Power & Politics (based in Ottawa with host Vassy Kapelos), and The National (with Adrienne Arsenault, Ian Hanomansing (Toronto), Andrew Chang (Vancouver) and Rosemary Barton (Ottawa)). The network dropped the four-anchor format on January 22, 2020, and had Arsenault and Chang co-anchor from Monday through Thursday with Hanomansing as solo anchor for the Friday and Sunday editions. Barton became the chief political correspondent for CBC News; she continues to host The National'''s weekly "At Issue" political panel.

Weather centre
In November 2005, the CBC News Weather Centre was established to cover local and international weather, using in part data provided by Environment Canada. Claire Martin was hired to serve as the primary face of the Weather Centre.

In April 2014, the national weather centre was effectively disbanded due to CBC budget cuts (Martin had left the CBC a few months prior); weather presenters at local CBC stations were retained but with the added responsibility of supplying reports for The National and CBC News Network.

In November 2014, citing difficulties implementing this new system, CBC announced a one-year trial content sharing partnership with The Weather Network, the privately owned cable specialty channel, which went into effect on December 8. Under the partnership, in exchange for access to weather-related news coverage from the CBC, The Weather Network provides the national weather reports seen on The National and CBCNN daytime programming, as well as local forecasts for CBC Toronto's weekend newscasts. Apart from Toronto, weather coverage during local newscasts was not affected, and CBC Vancouver meteorologist Johanna Wagstaffe continues to provide weather coverage for the Vancouver-based (primetime) editions of CBC News Now on CBC News Network.

Most local CBC stations have retained their weather team to provide local weather information, including:
 Johanna Wagstaffe – CBC Vancouver meteorologist
 Ian Black – CBC Ottawa meteorologist
 John Sauder – CBC Manitoba meteorologist
 Jay Scotland – CBC PEI meteorologist
 Karen Johnson – CBC Toronto and Windsor weather specialist
 Catherine Verdon-Diamond – CBC Montreal weather specialist
 Tanara McLean – CBC Edmonton/Calgary weather specialist

The content partnership with the Weather Network has continued beyond the original one-year period, and has been expanded. The weather section of CBC.ca has been phased out in favour of forecasts from The Weather Network, and local CBC news headlines are displayed on the latter's website.

Programming

Television
CBC News provides the following television programs.

Current programs:The National, flagship news programCBC News NowThe Fifth Estate, weekly news magazineMarketplace, consumer news magazinePower & Politics, political news programThe Investigators with Diana SwainLocal newscasts
Documentary series Doc Zone, The Passionate Eye, CBC Docs POV and The Nature of Things air on CBC News Network but are not produced by CBC News.Rosemary Barton Live, Sunday news program replacing The Weekly with Wendy MesleyCanada Tonight with Ginella Massa, weekday news program

Former programs:CBC News Magazine (1952–81)The Journal (1982–92)CBC Prime Time News (1992–1995)Mansbridge One on One (1999–2017)The Exchange (2009–2016)On the Money, business news program (2016–2018)The Weekly with Wendy Mesley (2018–2020)

Radio
CBC News provides the following radio programs.World Report, morning newscastThe World This Hour, hourly newscastThe World at Six, national dinner-hour newscastThe World This WeekendThe House, weekly national political affairs show
Local newscasts

 Digital 
CBC Digital provides the following services:

 CBCNews.ca website and Digital News App
 Live and on-demand streaming of radio and TV news programming
 Podcasts (broadcast highlights and original content like Finding Cleo)
 Social media including Facebook. Instagram and Snapchat. CBC News Twitter feed has over 2.5M followers.  
 Digital delivery of CBC News in airports, trains, elevators and coffee chain

Bias allegations
Public surveys in 2002 suggest that the CBC was viewed as less objective than other Canadian news networks, with results suggesting potential left-wing bias.

In 2009, CBC President Hubert Lacroix commissioned a study to determine whether its news was biased, and if so, to what extent. He said: "Our job — and we take it seriously — is to ensure that the information that we put out is fair and unbiased in everything that we do." The study suggests Canadians perceived the CBC as having a more left-of-centre bias than other Canadian news organizations.

A 2017 survey of Canadians suggested that CBC TV was the most biased national news media outlet (perceived biased by 50% of Canadians overall, tied with The Globe and Mail'') followed closely by CBC Radio (perceived biased by 49% of Canadians overall). Respondents predominantly saw a bias towards CBC TV and radio coverage favouring the Liberal party, a view that held consistently across Conservative, Liberal and NDP voters.

In October 2019, two weeks before the 2019 Canadian federal election, the CBC sued the Conservative Party of Canada for using excerpts from its leaders' debates in campaign material. The CBC petitioned for an injunction against the party continuing to use the excerpts as well as seeking an acknowledgement from the Conservative Party and its executive director, Dustin Van Vugt, that the party had "engaged in the unauthorized use of copyright-protected material". In response, the Conservative Party stated that 17 seconds of footage had been used, the video in question had been removed before the lawsuit was filed, and expressed "grave concern that this decision was made on the eve of an election that CBC is to be covering fairly and objectively". The CBC's lawsuit was dismissed in federal court decision that found that the Conservative Party's use was allowable and falls under fair dealing.

In January 2022, journalist Tara Henley publicly explained that she had left the CBC, saying that it has a "radical political agenda" that focuses too much on racial issues while ignoring important community and economic issues.

Hall of Fame 
The CBC News Hall of Fame was established in 2015 to honour men and women who have shaped Canadian journalism. Located in CBC's Toronto headquarters, inductees include:

 2015 – Knowlton Nash
 2016 – Joe Schlesinger
 2017 – Barbara Frum
 2018 – Trina McQueen
 2019 – Matthew Halton and Peter Stursberg
 2020 – Ernest Tucker
 2021 – Rassi Nashalik

Ombudsman

The CBC sets out to maintain its accuracy, integrity and fairness in its journalism. As a Canadian institution and a press undertaking, CBC set out the Journalistic Standards and Practices and works in compliance with these principles. Balanced viewpoints must be presented through on-the-air discussions. As it is with other public and private journalistic undertakings, credibility in the eyes of the general population is seen as the corporation's most valuable asset. The CBC Ombudsman is completely independent of CBC program staff and management, reporting directly to the President of the CBC and, through the President, to the corporation's board of directors.

Bureaus

CBC has reporters stationed in the following cities. Main cities are listed with the notation (M).

 Whitehorse, Yukon (M)
 Victoria, British Columbia
 Vancouver, British Columbia (M)
 Kamloops, British Columbia
 Kelowna, British Columbia
 Nelson, British Columbia
 Prince George, British Columbia
 Prince Rupert, British Columbia
 Yellowknife, Northwest Territories (M)
 Inuvik, Northwest Territories
 Calgary, Alberta (M)
 Edmonton, Alberta (M)
 Fort McMurray, Alberta
 Grande Prairie, Alberta
 Lethbridge, Alberta
 Saskatoon, Saskatchewan
 Regina, Saskatchewan (M)
 Winnipeg, Manitoba (M)
 Brandon, Manitoba
 Thunder Bay, Ontario
 Windsor, Ontario (M)
 London, Ontario
 Sudbury, Ontario
 Kingston, Ontario
 Kitchener-Waterloo, Ontario
 Hamilton, Ontario
 Toronto, Ontario (M)
 Ottawa, Ontario (M)
 Montreal, Quebec (M)
 Quebec City, Quebec (M)
 Sherbrooke, Quebec
 Fredericton, New Brunswick (M)
 Saint John, New Brunswick
 Happy Valley-Goose Bay, Newfoundland and Labrador
 Moncton, New Brunswick
 Bathurst, New Brunswick
 Halifax, Nova Scotia (M)
 Charlottetown, Prince Edward Island (M)
 Sydney, Nova Scotia
 Corner Brook, Newfoundland and Labrador
 Gander, Newfoundland and Labrador
 St. John's, Newfoundland and Labrador (M)
 Iqaluit, Nunavut

Currently vacant:

 Thompson, Manitoba
 Labrador City, Newfoundland and Labrador
 Hay River, Northwest Territories

International
 London, United Kingdom (M)
 Jerusalem, Israel (M)
 Washington, D.C., United States (M)
 New York City, United States (M)
 Los Angeles, United States

Former
 Moscow, Russia (closed May 2022)
 Beijing, China (closed November 2022; English-language posting vacant since 2020)

CBC also uses satellite bureaus, with reporters who fly in when a story occurs outside the bureaus. In the late 1990s, the CBC and other media outlets cut back their overseas operations.

Foreign correspondents

 London – Margaret Evans, Chris Brown, and Jared Thomas
 Jerusalem – Derek Stoffel
 Washington, D.C. – Paul Hunter/Katie Simpson with Matt Kwong, Ellen Mauro, and Lyndsay Duncombe
 New York – Kris Reyes
 Los Angeles –

See also

List of Canadian Broadcasting Corporation personalities
CNN

References

External links
CBC News
CBC Annual Reports (1996–97 to present)

 
1941 establishments in Canada
Canadian podcasters
Canadian news websites
Podcasting companies